Patrick Kelly (born 30 September 1986) is an Irish hurler who plays as a goalkeeper for club side Inagh-Kilnamona and is a former member of the Clare senior hurling team.

Kelly attended NUI Galway.

Playing career

St. Flannan's College
Kelly first enjoyed major success playing with the St. Flannan's College team.

In 2005 he was in goal as St. Flannan's faced Thurles CBS in the provincial decider, and made a great save to deny Brian Moran and an almost certain Thurles comeback. A 1-11 to 1-6 victory gave Kelly a Harty Cup medal. The subsequent All-Ireland decider saw St. Flannan's face St. Kieran's College. Kelly was singled out for particular praise in the 2-15 to 2-12 victory, giving him an All-Ireland medal.

Inagh-Kilnamona
Kelly plays his club hurling with Inagh-Kilnamona.

In 2007 he won a championship medal in the under-21 grade.

Clare

Under-21
Kelly was overlooked by the selectors for the Clare minor team, however, he was added to the Clare under-21 team in his final year of being eligible for the grade. On 17 July 2007, he made his debut in a 2-14 to 1-11 Munster semi-final defeat by Cork.

Senior
Kelly was added to the Clare senior panel by new manager Mike McNamara in 2008. He was an unused substitute throughout the entire National League and subsequent championship campaigns. On 29 March 2009, Kelly made his competitive debut in a 3-16 to 1-09 National League defeat by Kilkenny at Cusack Park.

Over the next two seasons Kelly was an unused substitute, however, in 2012 he became first-choice goalkeeper. On 7 April 2012, he claimed his first silverware at senior level when Clare defeated Limerick by 0-21 to 1-16 to secure the National League Division 1B title. Kelly subsequently made his Munster Championship debut on 17 June 2012 in a 1-18 to 2-17 defeat by Waterford.

On 10 February 2013, Kelly won a Waterford Crystal Cup title after a 1-21 to 1-13 defeat of Tipperary in the final at Semple Stadium. On 8 September 2013, he  lined out in goal in the All-Ireland final against Cork having earlier lost the Munster semi-final to the same opposition. Kelly made a number of key saves which denied Daniel Kearney and Anthony Nash goals from frees and the game ended in a 0-25 to 3-16 draw after a last-second point from corner-back Domhnall O'Donovan. The replay on 28 September 2013 also saw Kelly concede three goals, however, a hat-trick by Clare's Shane O'Donnell and further goals from Conor McGrath and Darach Honan secured a 5–16 to 3–16 victory for Clare and an All-Ireland medal for Kelly. He ended the season by being nominated for an All-Star award.

Kelly fell out of favour with the Clare selectors and was dropped as first-choice goalkeeper in favour of Donal Tuohy for the 2014 season. Over the next few seasons, Kelly and Tuohy alternated the goalkeeping position.

On 14 December 2018, Kelly announced his retirement from inter-county hurling.

Munster
In 2013 Kelly was sub goalkeeper to Anthony Nash on the Munster inter-provincial team. It was a successful campaign, as he claimed his first winners' medal following a 1-22 to 0-15 defeat of Connacht.

Career statistics

Inter-county

Honours

Team
St. Flannan's College
All-Ireland Colleges' Senior Hurling Championship (1): 2005
Munster Colleges' Senior Hurling Championship (1): 2005

Inagh-Kilnamona
Clare Under-21 Hurling Championship (1): 2007

Clare
All-Ireland Senior Hurling Championship (1): 2013
National Hurling League (1): 2016
National Hurling League Division 1B (1): 2012
Waterford Crystal Cup (1): 2013

Munster
Railway Cup (1): 2012 (sub)

References

1986 births
Living people
Alumni of the University of Galway
Inagh-Kilnamona hurlers
Clare inter-county hurlers
Munster inter-provincial hurlers
Hurling goalkeepers